The 16th National Television Awards ceremony was held at The O2 Arena in London on 26 January 2011 and was hosted by Dermot O'Leary. The awards are voted by the public and the winners are revealed live on ITV. Ant & Dec won the award for Most Popular Entertainment Presenter for the tenth year in a row, while Bruce Forsyth won the Special Recognition Award. Luis Urzúa, one of the miners who was saved from the 2010 Copiapó mining accident presented the award for Most Popular Drama. The award went to Waterloo Road, which meant Doctor Who failed to win the award for the first time since 2005. The 2010 X Factor winner Matt Cardle performed his number one single "When We Collide". Louie Spence of Pineapple Dance Studios performed a dance routine before presenting the award for Outstanding Serial Drama Performance.

Opening
A scene specially written by Steven Moffat and featuring host Dermot O'Leary and Matt Smith as the Eleventh Doctor was shown before the title sequence. O'Leary wakes up and realises he has missed the awards show and then The Doctor appears with the TARDIS to offer help. They travel through time and space and meet various people from the TV industry including Ant and Dec and EastEnders character Dot Branning. Eventually, the Doctor claims that the next destination is "a vast and terrible arena full of insane shrieking banshees thirsting for blood and conquest" which Dermot identifies as the National Television Awards.

Awards

Longlist
This is the list of full nominees for the 2011 National Television Awards. Voting was open to the public from September 2010 until January 2011.

References

External links
National Television Awards 
Indigo Television - Producers of the awards show

National Television Awards
National Television Awards
National Television Awards
2011 in London
National Television Awards
National Television Awards